The  Supreme Petroleum Council is the highest governing body of oil, gas and similar industry-related activities in Abu Dhabi. The Council was formed in 1988. The Council is tasked with supervising all oil and gas companies that operate in Abu Dhabi and the United Arab Emirates. The Council also acts as the board of directors for the Abu Dhabi National Oil Company. on 27 December 2020, president Sheikh Khalifa bin Zayed, the ruler of Abu Dhabi, announced the establishment of a new council, Supreme Council for Financial and Economic Affairs that would also oversee matters relating to petroleum and natural resources putting an end to Supreme Petroleum Council.

List of member of the defunct council 
Mohammed bin Zayed Al Nahyan, Chairman
Vacant, Vice Chairman
Hazza bin Zayed Al Nahyan, member
Mansour bin Zayed Al Nahyan, member
Hamed bin Zayed Al Nahyan, member
Mohammed bin Khalifa bin Zayed Al Nahyan, member
Dhiyab bin Mohamed bin Zayed Al Nahyan, member
Suhail Mohamed Faraj Al Mazrouei, member
Hamad Mubarak Al Shamsi, member and secretary-general of the council
Sultan Ahmed Al Jaber, member
Dr. Ahmed Mubarak Al Mazrouei, member
Khaldoon Khalifa Al Mubarak, member
Riyad Abdul Rahman Al Mubarak, member
Abdulla Bin Mohammed Bin Butti Al Hamed, member
Abdullah Nasser Al Suwaidi, member
Suhail Fares Ghanem Al Mazrouei, member

Former important board members include :

Jouan Salem Al Dhaheri (1948–2013) was appointed in 26 June 2011 as Secretary-general. One of the oldest officials in Abu Dhabi. He died from heart stroke on 27 April 2013.

References

Government agencies of Abu Dhabi
Oil and gas companies of the United Arab Emirates
Petroleum politics